The New South Wales Special Minister of State was a minister in the Government of New South Wales with responsibility for special administrative matters in the state of New South Wales, Australia. The portfolio was established in 1988 in first Greiner–Murray ministry as the Minister for Administrative Services, and after several reincarnations as the Special Minister of State, was abolished on 21 December 2021 when the second Perrottet ministry was established. 

The most recent Special Minister of State from 3 July 2020 until 21 December 2021, was Don Harwin, who also held the additional portfolio title of Minister for the Public Service and Employee Relations, Aboriginal Affairs, and the Arts.

When the portfolio existed, the minister administered the portfolio through the Premier and Cabinet cluster, in particular through the Department of Premier and Cabinet, a department of the Government of New South Wales, and additional agencies.

Ultimately the minister was responsible to the Parliament of New South Wales.

List of ministers

Special Minister of State
The following individuals served as the Special Ministers of State, or any precedent titles:

See also

List of New South Wales government agencies

References

Defunct government positions of New South Wales
2021 disestablishments in Australia
1988 establishments in Australia